The 35th NAACP Image Awards ceremony, presented by the National Association for the Advancement of Colored People (NAACP), honored the best in film, television, music of 2003 and took place on March 6, 2004 at the Universal Amphitheatre.

The following is a listing of nominees, with winners in bold:

Winners

Film
Outstanding Motion Picture
The Fighting Temptations 
Bad Boys II
Bend It Like Beckham
Deliver Us from Eva
Whale Rider

Outstanding Actor in a Motion Picture 
Cuba Gooding Jr. - Radio 
Samuel L. Jackson- S.W.A.T.
Will Smith- Bad Boys II 
Denzel Washington- Out of Time 
Laurence Fishburne- The Matrix Revolutions

Outstanding Actress in a Motion Picture 
Queen Latifah - Bringing Down the House 
Halle Berry- Gothika
Beyoncé- The Fighting Temptations
Keisha Castle-Hughes- Whale Rider
Gabrielle Union- Deliver Us from Eva
Outstanding Supporting Actor: Morgan Freeman - Bruce Almighty
Outstanding Supporting Actress: Alfre Woodard - Radio

Television
Outstanding Comedy Series
The Bernie Mac Show 
Girlfriends 
Half & Half 
Whoopi 
My Wife and Kids

Outstanding Drama Series  
Soul Food
24
Boston Public
CSI: Miami
The Wire

Outstanding Actor in a Comedy Series
Bernie Mac- The Bernie Mac Show 
Dave Chappelle- The Chappelle Show
George Lopez- The George Lopez Show
Flex Alexander- One on One
Damon Wayans- My Wife and Kids 

Outstanding Actress in a Comedy Series
Mo'Nique- The Parkers 
Tisha Campbell-Martin- My Wife and Kids
Tracee Ellis Ross- Girlfriends 
Kellita Smith- The Bernie Mac Show
Whoopi Goldberg- Whoopi 

Outstanding Supporting Actor in a Comedy Series
Dorien Wilson- The Parkers 
Chico Benymon- Half & Half 
Blair Underwood- Sex and the City
George O. Gore II- My Wife and Kids 
Jeremy Suarez- The Bernie Mac Show 

Outstanding Supporting Actress in a Comedy Series
Camille Winbush- The Bernie Mac Show 
Dee Dee Davis- The Bernie Mac Show 
Kyla Pratt- One on One
Telma Hopkins- Half & Half 
Valarie Pettiford- Half & Half

Outstanding Actor in a Drama Series
Steve Harris- The Practice
Gary Dourdan- CSI: Crime Scene Investigation
Jesse L. Martin- Law & Order 
Dennis Haysbert- 24
Wendell Pierce- The Wire

Outstanding Actress in a Drama Series
Nia Long- Third Watch
Nicole Ari Parker- Soul Food
C. C. H. Pounder- The Shield
Malinda Williams- Soul Food
Vanessa A. Williams- Soul Food 

Outstanding Supporting Actor in a Drama Series
Mekhi Phifer- ER
Darrin Henson- Soul Food
Dulé Hill- The West Wing 
Boris Kodjoe- Soul Food
Ice-T- Law & Order: Special Victims Unit 

Outstanding Supporting Actress in a Drama Series
Loretta Devine- Boston Public 
Vanessa Bell Calloway- The District 
Pam Grier- Law & Order: Special Victims Unit 
Terri J. Vaughn- Soul Food 
Anna Deavere Smith- The District  

Outstanding Television Movie, Mini-Series or Dramatic Special
D.C. Sniper: 23 Days of Fear
Good Fences
Jasper, Texas
Deacons for Defense
Sounder

Outstanding Actor in a Television Movie, Mini-Series or Dramatic Special
Charles S. Dutton- D.C. Sniper: 23 Days of Fear
Ossie Davis- Deacons for Defense 
Louis Gossett Jr.- Jasper, Texas 
Forest Whitaker- Deacons for Defense 
Danny Glover- Good Fences 

Outstanding Actress in a Television Movie, Mini-Series or Dramatic Special
Whoopi Goldberg- Good Fences
Suzzanne Douglas- Sounder
Mo'Nique- Good Fences
Vanessa Ferlito- Undefeated 

Outstanding Actor in a Daytime Drama Series
Kristoff St. John- The Young and the Restless
Tyler Christopher- General Hospital
Keith Hamilton Cobb- The Young and the Restless
James Reynolds- Days of Our Lives

Outstanding Actress in a Daytime Drama Series
Victoria Rowell- The Young and the Restless
Tracey Ross- Passions 
Tamara Tunie- As the World Turns 
Renée Elise Goldsberry- One Life to Live
Tonya Lee Williams- The Young and the Restless

Outstanding News/Information – Series or Special
Judge Mathis
106 & Park Top 10 Live 
American Experience
Brother Outsider: The Life of Bayard Rustin
Unchained Memories: Readings from the Slave Narratives

Outstanding Variety – Series or Special
The 2003 Essence Awards
BET Awards 2003
The 11th Annual Trumpet Awards 
Chappelle's Show
Def Poetry Jam

Outstanding Performance by a Youth (Series, Special, Television Movie or Limited-series)
Raven-Symoné- That's So Raven
Tommy Davidson- The Proud Family
Kyla Pratt- The Proud Family
Cree Summer- All Grown Up!
Lynn Whitfield- The Cheetah Girls

Music 
Outstanding New Artist
Ruben Studdard
Beyoncé
Byron Cage
Anthony Hamilton
Heather Headley 

Outstanding Male Artist 
Luther Vandross
Mos Def
Gerald Levert
Musiq Soulchild
Seal 

Outstanding Female Artist
Alicia Keys
Beyoncé
Mary J. Blige
Aretha Franklin
Heather Headley 

Outstanding Duo or Group 
OutKast
Mary J. Blige and Eve
The Neptunes
The Roots 

Outstanding Jazz Artist
Ramsey Lewis

Outstanding Gospel Artist
Donnie McClurkin
Shirley Caesar
Byron Cage
Bishop TD Jakes and The Potter's House Mass Choir
Vickie Winans

Outstanding Music Video
Luther Vandross- Dance with My Father" 
Beyoncé - Crazy in Love
India Arie-"The Truth" 
Outkast- Hey Ya!
Outkast- The Way You Move

References 

N
N
N
NAACP Image Awards